The 1941 Cupa României Final was the 8th final of Romania's most prestigious football cup competition. It was disputed between Unirea Tricolor București and Rapid București, and was won by Rapid București after a game with 7 goals. It was the sixth cup for Rapid, and the five of six consecutive successes.

Match details

See also 
List of Cupa României finals

References

External links
Romaniansoccer.ro

1941
Cupa
Romania